Charles Aaron Moody (1792 – 17 December 1867) was a British Conservative Party politician.

He was elected at the 1847 general election as one of the two Members of Parliament for West Somerset, and held the seat until he resigned from the House of Commons on 23 January 1863 by becoming Steward of the Manor of Northstead.

References

External links 
 

1792 births
1867 deaths
Conservative Party (UK) MPs for English constituencies
UK MPs 1847–1852
UK MPs 1852–1857
UK MPs 1857–1859
UK MPs 1859–1865